Oracle Cloud Platform refers to a Platform as a Service (PaaS) offerings by Oracle Corporation as part of Oracle Cloud Infrastructure. These offerings are used to build, deploy, integrate and extend applications in the cloud. The offerings support a variety of programming languages, databases, tools and frameworks including Oracle-specific, open source and third-party software and systems.

Deployment Models 
Oracle Cloud Platform offers public, private and hybrid cloud deployment models.

Architecture 
Oracle Cloud Platform provides both Infrastructure as a Service (IaaS) and Platform as a Service (PaaS). The infrastructure is offered through a global network of Oracle managed data centers. Oracle deploys their cloud in Regions. Inside each Region are at least three fault-independent Availability Domains. Each of these Availability Domains contains an independent data center with power, thermal and network isolation. Oracle Cloud is generally available in North America, EMEA, APAC and Japan with announced South America and US Govt. regions coming soon.

See also 
 Platform as a service
 Oracle Cloud (including Oracle Cloud Infrastructure)
 Oracle Advertising and Customer Experience (CX)
 Oracle Cloud Enterprise Resource Planning (ERP)
 Oracle Cloud Human Capital Management (HCM)
 Oracle Cloud Supply Chain Management (SCM)

Further reading 
 Ovum Decision Matrix: Selecting a Cloud Platform for Hybrid Integration Vendor, 2019-20

References

External links 
 Official website

Oracle Corporation
Cloud computing
Cloud computing providers
Cloud platforms
Cloud infrastructure
Oracle Cloud Services